Stara Biała  is a village in the administrative district of Gmina Stara Biała, within Płock County, Masovian Voivodeship, in east-central Poland.

The population of the village is 442 and the post code is 09-411.

Landmarks
Church of Saint Hedwig of Silesia
John Paul II primary school. 
Communal Public Library
A road connecting the village with Kamionki runs through the center of Stara Biała.

References

Villages in Płock County